Viktoria Viktorovna Listunova (born 12 May 2005) is a Russian artistic gymnast. She represented the Russian Olympic Committee at the 2020 Summer Olympics and won the gold medal in the team event. She was a member of the team that won gold at the inaugural Junior World Championships. Individually, she is the 2019 Junior World all-around and floor exercise champion, the 2021 European all-around champion, and the 2021, 2022, and 2023 Russian National Champion.

Personal life
Listunova was born in Moscow, Russia on 12 May 2005.  In April 2018, she appeared on the Russian talent show Blue Bird.  In 2019, she  received the title of Candidate for Master of Sport in the Russian Federation.

On 18 March 2022 Listunova participated in the Moscow rally in support of the Russian invasion of Ukraine.

Gymnastics career

Junior

2018
Listunova made her international debut at International Gymnix in March 2018 where she placed third in the all-around behind Zoé Allaire-Bourgie of Canada and Asia D'Amato of Italy.  During event finals she placed eighth on vault, second on uneven bars behind compatriot Elena Gerasimova, sixth on balance beam, and won gold on floor exercise.  In June she competed at the Russian National Championships as an Espoir.  She won gold in the all-around, on uneven bars, and on floor exercise.  She won silver on vault behind Angelina Kosynkina and won bronze on balance beam behind Yulia Nikolayeva and Sofia Koroleva. In December Listunova competed at the 2018 Voronin Cup where she won silver in the all-around behind Vladislava Urazova.  She won silver on floor exercise behind Urazova, bronze on vault behind Urazova and Darya Yassinskaya of Kazakhstan, and placed fourth on uneven bars.

2019
Listunova competed at the 2019 City of Jesolo Trophy. She helped Russia win gold ahead of the United States.  In event finals she placed second on vault and first on balance beam and floor exercise.  In May she competed at the Russian National Championships where she won silver in the all-around behind Vladislava Urazova.  She also qualified three event finals where she won silver on vault, gold on floor exercise, and bronze on balance beam.

In late June Listunova competed at the inaugural Junior World Championships alongside Vladislava Urazova and Elena Gerasimova.  Together the team won gold, finishing 2.157 points ahead of second place China.  Individually she won gold in the all-around and qualified to the floor exercise, uneven bars, and vault event finals.  On the first day of event finals she finished eighth on vault and won silver on uneven bars behind teammate Urazova.  On the second day of event finals Listunova won gold on floor exercise and was the only competitor to score above 14.

In July Listunova competed at the 2019 European Youth Olympic Festival alongside Iana Vorona and Irina Komnova.  While there she helped Russia win the gold in the team final and individually she qualified first in the all-around.  During the all-around final she once again placed first, finishing ahead of Ondine Achampong of Great Britain and Vorona.  During event finals she won gold on vault, uneven bars, and floor exercise and finished seventh on balance beam after falling on her wolf turn.

In November Listunova competed at Elite Gym Massilia where she placed second in the all-around, behind of Vorona, first on floor exercise, and fifth on balance beam.

Senior

2021 
Listunova turned senior in 2021 and made her senior debut at the Russian National Championships in March.  She finished qualifications with a score of 57.566, the highest of the day.  During the all-around final she earned a 56.598, the second highest of the day behind Vladislava Urazova; however her two day total was higher and therefore Listunova became the Russian National Champion.  Listunova was the only athlete to qualify to all four event finals.  She won gold on balance beam and silver on uneven bars (behind Urazova), vault, and floor exercise (behind Angelina Melnikova).

In April it was announced that Listunova would make her senior international debut at the European Championships in Basel alongside Melnikova, Urazova, and Elena Gerasimova.  During qualifications Listunova finished second in the all-around behind Melnikova.  Due to finishing top 2 amongst individuals who did not help qualify a team or qualify individually to the Olympic Games, Listunova qualified an additional quota for Russia.  Listunova also qualified to the floor exercise final.  During the all-around final Listunova won the all-around gold medal, placing ahead of Melnikova and Jessica Gadirova. Listunova became only the second woman to have won the all-around at the European championships as a first-year senior, a feat only ever achieved by Romania's Nadia Comăneci in 1975.

Listunova competed at the Russian Cup in June.  During qualifications she finished in third behind Melnikova and Urazova after falling off the balance beam and during floor exercise.  During the all-around final she managed to pull ahead and finished in first place.  After the competition Valentina Rodionenko, the senior coach of the Russian national artistic gymnastics team, announced that Listunova would be on the Olympic Team along with Melnikova and Urazova.

At the Olympic Games Listunova qualified to the floor exercise final.  She scored highly enough to qualify to the all-around and uneven bars finals, but did not due to two-per-country limitations.  Additionally she helped the Russian Olympic Committee to qualify to the team final in a surprise first place, ahead of the United States team.  During the team final Simone Biles withdrew after vault; Listunova competed on all events except vault.  Although teammates Melnikova and Urazova fell off the balance beam, the Russian team performed well on all other routines and finished in first place, over three points ahead of the second-place American team.  During the floor exercise final, Listunova stepped out of bounds on her first tumbling pass and fell during her second, resulting in an eighth-place finish.

In September it was revealed that Listunova would forgo competing at the upcoming World Championships in order to heal from an elbow injury.

2022 
Listunova competed at the Doha World Cup in early March.  She qualified to the vault and uneven bars finals in first place and was the second reserve for the balance beam final.  During event finals Listunova placed third on vault behind Oksana Chusovitina and Csenge Bácskay and won gold on uneven bars.  

While in Doha it was announced that starting March 7 Russian and Belarusian athletes would be banned from taking part in FIG-sanctioned competitions due to the 2022 Russian invasion of Ukraine.

Selected competitive skills

Competitive history

References

External links

 

2005 births
Living people
Russian female artistic gymnasts
Gymnasts from Moscow
Medalists at the Junior World Artistic Gymnastics Championships
European champions in gymnastics
Gymnasts at the 2020 Summer Olympics
Olympic medalists in gymnastics
Medalists at the 2020 Summer Olympics
Olympic gold medalists for the Russian Olympic Committee athletes